Andrew Kellaway (born 12 October 1995) is an Australian rugby union player who currently plays for the Melbourne Rebels in the Super Rugby competition. Kellaway has been capped for Australia's national team, the Wallabies. His regular playing positions are Centre, fullback or wing.

Early life
After beginning his junior rugby at the Hunters Hill Rugby Club, Kellaway went on to represent Australia at schoolboy and under-20 level. His total of ten tries at the 2014 IRB Junior World Championship broke the tournament record previously held by Julian Savea and Zac Guildford. He then captained the under-20 side in 2015.

Rugby career

In late 2014, Kellaway began playing for the New South Wales Country Eagles in the National Rugby Championship. He made his Super Rugby run-on debut for the Waratahs against the Brumbies in April 2016. The following week, he signed a further two-year contract with the Waratahs.

Kellaway joined English club Northampton Saints for the 2018–19 season. Following a stint in Japan with NEC, Kellaway returned to the Rebels for the 2021 Super Rugby Trans-Tasman competition and was selected in the Wallabies squad for the mid-year tests by national coach Dave Rennie. He made his international debut against  in July 2021 at Suncorp Stadium.

International tries
As of 15 September 2022.

Super Rugby statistics

References

External links
 It's Rugby player statistics
 ESPN profile

1995 births
Living people
Australian rugby union players
Australia international rugby union players
Australian expatriate sportspeople in England
Rugby union fullbacks
Rugby union wings
New South Wales Country Eagles players
Rugby union players from Sydney
New South Wales Waratahs players
Australian expatriate rugby union players
Expatriate rugby union players in England
Northampton Saints players
Expatriate rugby union players in New Zealand
Counties Manukau rugby union players
Melbourne Rebels players
Expatriate rugby union players in Japan
Green Rockets Tokatsu players